The 2019 McNeese State Cowboys baseball team represented McNeese State University in the 2019 NCAA Division I baseball season. The Cowboys played their home games at Joe Miller Ballpark. They, along with the LSU Tigers baseball team, and the Southern University baseball team, were the only three teams in the state to make it to the NCAA Tournament. They were also the lone member from the Southland Conference.

Roster

Coaching staff

Schedule

! style="" | Regular Season
|- valign="top" 

|- bgcolor="#ccffcc"
| 1 || February 15 || at UTSA || Roadrunner Field • San Antonio, TX || W 16–5 || 1–0 ||
|- bgcolor="#ccffcc"
| 2 || February 16 || at UTSA || Roadrunner Field • San Antonio, TX || W 12–3 || 2–0 ||
|- bgcolor="#ffcccc"
| 3 || February 17 || at UTSA || Roadrunner Field • San Antonio, TX || L 2-5 || 2–1 || 
|- bgcolor="#ccffcc"
| 4 || February 20 || at Houston || Schroeder Park • Houston, TX || W 13–5 (14 inn) || 3–1 ||
|- bgcolor="#ffcccc"
| 5 || February 22 || vs. Texas State (Lake Area Classic) || Joe Miller Ballpark • Lake Charles, LA || L 10–18 || 3–2 ||
|- bgcolor="#ffcccc"
| 6 || February 23 || vs. Creighton (Lake Area Classic) || Joe Miller Ballpark • Lake Charles, LA || L 7–11 || 3–3 ||
|- bgcolor="#ffffff"
| 7 || February 24 || vs. Creighton (Lake Area Classic) || Joe Miller Ballpark • Lake Charles, LA || colspan=4 |Game canceled
|- bgcolor="#ffcccc"
| 8 || February 24 || vs. Texas State (Lake Area Classic) || Joe Miller Ballpark • Lake Charles, LA || L 3–5 (11 inn) || 3–4 ||
|- bgcolor="#ccffcc"
| 9 || February 26|| Alcorn State || Joe Miller Ballpark • Lake Charles, LA || W 8–1 || 4–4 ||
|-

|- bgcolor="#ccffcc"
| 10 || March 1 || vs. Nicholls (Mardi Gras Classic) || Joe Miller Ballpark • Lake Charles, LA || W 7–6 || 5–4 ||
|- bgcolor="#ccffcc"
| 11 || March 2 || vs. Holy Cross (Mardi Gras Classic) || Joe Miller Ballpark • Lake Charles, LA || W 13–0 || 6–4 ||
|- bgcolor="#ccffcc"
| 12 || March 3 || vs. Nicholls (Mardi Gras Classic) || Joe Miller Ballpark • Lake Charles, LA || W 5–4 (10 inn) || 7–4 ||
|- bgcolor="#ccffcc"
| 13 || March 4 || vs. Holy Cross (Mardi Gras Classic) || Joe Miller Ballpark • Lake Charles, LA || W 4–1 || 8–4 ||
|- bgcolor="#ffcccc"
| 14 || March 6 || Louisiana || Joe Miller Ballpark • Lake Charles, LA || L 10–17 || 8–5 ||
|- bgcolor="#ccffcc"
| 15 || March 8 || at Louisiana-Monroe || Warhawk Field • Monroe, LA || W 13–12 || 9–5 ||
|- bgcolor="#ffcccc"
| 16 || March 9 || at Louisiana-Monroe || Warhawk Field • Monroe, LA || L 5–10 || 9–6 ||
|- bgcolor="#ccffcc"
| 17 || March 10 || at Louisiana-Monroe || Warhawk Field • Monroe, LA || W 10-2 || 10–6 ||
|- bgcolor="#ffcccc"
| 18 || March 12 || at Tulane || Greer Field at Turchin Stadium • New Orleans, LA || L 3–9 || 10–7 ||
|- bgcolor="#ccffcc"
| 19 || March 15 || Lamar || Joe Miller Ballpark • Lake Charles, LA || W 6–1 || 11–7 || 1–0
|- bgcolor="#ffcccc"
| 20 || March 16 || Lamar || Joe Miller Ballpark • Lake Charles, LA || L 1–2 (11 inn) || 11–8 || 1–1
|- bgcolor="#ccffcc"
| 21 || March 17 || Lamar || Joe Miller Ballpark • Lake Charles, LA || W 6-4 || 12–8 || 2-1
|- bgcolor="#ccffcc"
| 22 || March 19 || Houston || Joe Miller Ballpark • Lake Charles, LA || W 1-0 || 13–8 ||
|- bgcolor="#ffcccc"
| 23 || March 22 || Incarnate Word || Joe Miller Ballpark • Lake Charles, LA || L 1-4 || 13–9 || 2-2
|- bgcolor="#ffcccc"
| 24 || March 23 || Incarnate Word || Joe Miller Ballpark • Lake Charles, LA || L 5-6 (10 inn) || 13–10 || 2-3
|- bgcolor="#ffcccc"
| 25 || March 24 || Incarnate Word || Joe Miller Ballpark • Lake Charles, LA || L 6-8 || 13–11 || 2-4
|- bgcolor="#ccffcc"
| 26 || March 26 || at #12 LSU || Tiger Park • Baton Rouge, LA || W 2–0 || 14–11 ||
|- align="center" bgcolor="#ccffcc
| 27 || March 29 || at Sam Houston State || Don Sanders Stadium • Huntsville, TX || W 4–3 || 15–11 || 3–4
|-

|- bgcolor="#ffcccc"
| 28 || April 3 || at Louisiana Tech || J. C. Love Field at Pat Patterson Park • Ruston, LA || L 4-10 || 15–12 ||
|- bgcolor="#ffcccc"
| 29 || April 5 || at Central Arkansas || Bear Stadium • Conway, AR || L 2–4 || 15–13 || 3–5
|- bgcolor="#ccffcc"
| 30 || April 5 || at Central Arkansas || Bear Stadium • Conway, AR || W 2–1 || 16–13 || 4–5
|- bgcolor="#ffcccc"
| 31 || April 6 || at Central Arkansas || Bear Stadium • Conway, AR || L 1–5 || 16–14 || 4–6
|- bgcolor="#ccffcc"
| 32 || April 10 || at Louisiana || M. L. Tigue Moore Field at Russo Park • Lafayette, LA || W 6–3 || 17–14 ||
|- bgcolor="#ccffcc"
| 33 || April 12 || New Orleans || Joe Miller Ballpark • Lake Charles, LA || W 2–1 || 18–14 || 5–6
|- bgcolor="#ffcccc"
| 34 || April 12 || New Orleans || Joe Miller Ballpark • Lake Charles, LA || L 0–2 || 18–15 || 5–7
|- bgcolor="#ccffcc"
| 35 || April 13 || New Orleans || Joe Miller Ballpark • Lake Charles, LA || W 16–4 (7 inn) || 19–15 || 6–7
|- bgcolor="#ffcccc"
| 36 || April 16 || Southeastern Louisiana || Joe Miller Ballpark • Lake Charles, LA || L 3–12 || 19–16 ||
|- bgcolor="#ccffcc"
| 37 || April 19 || at Northwestern State || H. Alvin Brown–C. C. Stroud Field • Natchitoches, LA || W 7-4 || 20–16 || 7–7
|- bgcolor="#ffcccc"
| 38 || April 20 || at Northwestern State || H. Alvin Brown-C. C. Stroud Field • Natchitoches, LA || L 0–6 || 20–17 || 7–8
|- bgcolor="#ffcccc"
| 39 || April 20 || at Northwestern State || H. Alvin Brown-C. C. Stroud Field • Natchitoches, LA || L 5–6 || 20–18 || 7-9
|- bgcolor="#ccffcc"
| 40 || April 24 || Louisiana Tech || Joe Miller Ballpark • Lake Charles, LA || W 5–3 || 21–18 || 
|- bgcolor="#ffcccc"
| 41 || April 26 || at Abilene Christian || Crutcher Scott Field • Abilene, TX || L 5–9 || 21–19 || 7-10
|- bgcolor="#ccffcc"
| 42 || April 27 || at Abilene Christian || Crutcher Scott Field • Abilene, TX || W 10–4 || 22–19 || 8–10
|- bgcolor="#ccffcc"
| 43 || April 28 || at Abilene Christian || Crutcher Scott Field • Abilene, TX || W 7–6 (10 inn) || 23–19 || 9–10
|-

|- bgcolor="#ffcccc"
| 44 || May 1 || at Southeastern Louisiana || Pat Kenelly Diamond at Alumni Field • Hammond, LA || L 3–4 || 23–20 ||
|- bgcolor="#ccffcc"
| 45 || May 3 || Stephen F. Austin || Joe Miller Ballpark • Lake Charles, LA || W 2-0 || 24–20 || 10–10
|- bgcolor="#ccffcc"
| 46 || May 4 || Stephen F. Austin || Joe Miller Ballpark • Lake Charles, LA || W 6–1 || 25–20 || 11–10
|- bgcolor="#ccffcc"
| 47 || May 5 || Stephen F. Austin || Joe Miller Ballpark • Lake Charles, LA || W 5–1 || 26–20 || 12–10
|- bgcolor="#ccffcc"
| 48 || May 8 || Prairie View A&M || Joe Miller Ballpark • Lake Charles, LA || W 4–1 || 27–20 ||
|- bgcolor="#ccffcc"
| 49 || May 10 || Texas A&M-Corpus Christi || Joe Miller Ballpark • Lake Charles, LA || W 5–2 || 28–20 || 13–10
|- bgcolor="#ffcccc"
| 50 || May 12 || Texas A&M-Corpus Christi || Joe Miller Ballpark • Lake Charles, LA || L 0-2 || 28-21 || 13-11
|- bgcolor="#ccffcc"
| 51 || May 12 || Texas A&M-Corpus Christi || Joe Miller Ballpark • Lake Charles, LA || W 8–4 || 29–21 || 14–11
|- bgcolor="#ffcccc"
| 52 || May 16 || at Houston Baptist || Husky Field • Houston, TX || L 2–6 || 29–22 || 14–12
|- bgcolor="#ccffcc"
| 53 || May 17 || at Houston Baptist || Husky Field • Houston, TX || W 16–6 || 30–22 || 15–12
|- bgcolor="#ccffcc"
| 53 || May 18 || at Houston Baptist || Husky Field • Houston, TX || W 5–1 || 31–22 || 16–12
|-

|-
! style="" | Post-Season
|- valign="top" 
|-
|-

|- bgcolor="#ccffcc"
| 54 || May 22 || vs. Incarnate Word || Constellation Field • Sugar Land, TX || W 2–1 || 32–22 ||
|- bgcolor="#ccffcc"
| 55 || May 23 || vs. Texas A&M-Corpus Christi || Constellation Field • Sugar Land, TX || W 7-2 || 33-22 ||
|- bgcolor="#ccffcc"
| 56 || May 24 || vs. Incarnate Word || Constellation Field • Sugar Land, TX || W 5-3 || 34-22 ||
|- bgcolor="#ccffcc"
| 57 || May 24 || vs. Central Arkansas || Constellation Field • Sugar Land, TX || W 4-2 || 35-22 ||
|-

|- bgcolor="#ffcccc"
| 58 || May 31 || vs. Indiana State || Hawkins Field • Nashville, TN || L 5-6 || 35-23 ||
|- bgcolor="#ffcccc"
| 59 || June 1 || vs. Ohio State || Hawkins Field • Nashville, TN || L 8-9 (13 inn) || 35-24 ||
|-

|

Nashville Regional

References

McNeese State Cowboys
McNeese Cowboys baseball seasons
McNeese State baseball
McNeese State